Imma alienella is a moth in the family Immidae. It was described by Francis Walker in 1864. It is found on Borneo.

Adults are dark cupreous brown, the forewings with luteous (muddy-yellow) marks. There is a short oblique basal streak, a middle band composed of three irregularly triangular spots, an apical triangular spot and some connected marginal points. The hindwings are pale cinereous (ash gray) along the costa.

References

Moths described in 1864
Immidae
Moths of Asia